Michael Chen Wing Sum (born 26 June 1932) is a Malaysian politician.

Across his political career, he has served as Housing, Local Government and New Village Minister as well as the Senate President.

He is married to Toh Puan Helen Chen.

Political career
Michael Chen joined the Malaysian Chinese Association (MCA) in 1960. He successfully ran for MP for the Damansara constituency in Selangor in the 1964 general elections. He was subsequently appointed as Parliamentary Secretary to the Deputy Prime Minister, Tun Abdul Razak Hussein in Tunku Abdul Rahman third cabinet. However, Chen failed retained his seat in 1969 general elections. In 1972, Chen contested Ulu Selangor after the death of the incumbent MP Khaw Kai Boh and won the seat. Chen was appointed as Minister with Special Functions in Abdul Razak first cabinet.

In 1977, Chen objected to an attempt to replace the Deputy President of MCA Lee Siok Yew with Chong Hon Nyan, and managed to defeat Chong for the position. He moved to challenge Lee San Choon for the MCA presidency itself in 1979, but was defeated. He did not challenge for the MCA presidency in 1981 as some who might have supported him had been expelled from the party; later he led a group of his supporters out of MCA to join the Gerakan.

He contested the 1982 election under the Gerakan's banner and won his seat. He was a member of the parliament until 1986. From 1997 until 2003, he served in the Dewan Negara. He was deputy president from 1997 to 2000, and president from 2000 to 2003.

Election results

Honours

Honours of Malaysia
  : 
 Recipient of the Malaysian Commemorative Medal (Silver) (PPM) (1965)
 Commander of the Order of Loyalty to the Crown of Malaysia (PSM) – Tan Sri (2002)
 Grand Commander of the Order of Loyalty to the Crown of Malaysia (SSM) – Tun (2017)
  :
  Knight Commander of the Order of the Crown of Selangor (DPMS) – Dato' (1977)

References

Living people
1932 births
People from Perak
Malaysian politicians of Chinese descent
Malaysian journalists

20th-century Malaysian lawyers

Former Parti Gerakan Rakyat Malaysia politicians
Malaysian Chinese Association politicians
Government ministers of Malaysia
Members of the Dewan Rakyat
Members of the Dewan Negara
Presidents of the Dewan Negara
Members of Lincoln's Inn
Commanders of the Order of Loyalty to the Crown of Malaysia
Grand Commanders of the Order of Loyalty to the Crown of Malaysia
21st-century Malaysian politicians
Knights Commander of the Order of the Crown of Selangor